Pentapoli (Byzantine Greek: Ξυλοπήγαδο) a small town in Serres regional unit of Central Macedonia, Greece, located 14 km southeast of the city of Serres. Since 2011 it is a municipal unit of the municipality of Emmanouil Pappas and has a population of 1.715 inhabitants. Until 1928 it was named Sarmusakli.

At Pentapolis is testified the traces of an ancient settlement. His cemetery was unveiled at the location "Alonia", where coins and vases of Roman times had been found in the past.

References

Populated places in Serres (regional unit)
Archaeological sites in Macedonia (Greece)